The Leukaspides ( "White Shields") may have made up one of the two probable corps of the Antigonid Macedonian phalanx in the Hellenistic period, with the Chalkaspides ("Bronze Shields") forming the other. However, this conclusion is contested, as the Thracians at Pydna also had white shields (as did many other Hellenistic thyreophoroi or auxiliary infantry from the period) so the reference may simply refer to these and there may not have been a corps of "white shields" within the phalanx at all. If this theory is correct, then it is likely that the term "bronze shields" applied only to the phalanx part of the Antigonid army. Possible supporting evidence for this claim can be drawn from the fact that the latter term in the 1st century BC Mithridatic army of Pontus is used by Plutarch to define its phalanx component against the other infantry.

The Leukaspides were notably used by Antigonus Doson in his campaign against Cleomenes III of Sparta in the 220's BC (Plutarch, Cleom. 23.11), and the shields of the Leukaspides are mentioned as spoils of war after the Battle of Pydna in 168 BC (Diodorus Siculus, 31.10).

See also 
 Argyraspides

Sources
Head, Duncan (1982). Armies of the Macedonian and Punic Wars. WRG.

Sekunda, Nicholas (2012). "The Macedonian Army after Alexander, 323-168 BC". Osprey Publishing

 Ancient Greek military terminology
 Military units and formations of the Hellenistic world
 Infantry units and formations of Macedon
Ancient Greek infantry types